Vikas Yadav (born 20 July 1996) is an Indian cricketer. He made his first-class debut for Services in the 2016–17 Ranji Trophy on 6 October 2016. He made his List A debut for Services in the 2017–18 Vijay Hazare Trophy on 5 February 2018. He made his Twenty20 debut for Services in the 2018–19 Syed Mushtaq Ali Trophy on 21 February 2019.

References

External links
 

1996 births
Living people
Indian cricketers
Services cricketers
People from Bharuch